Headon is a surname. Notable people with the surname include:

 Hefina Headon (1930–2013), Welsh human rights activist
 Thomas Headon (born 2000), British-born Australian singer-songwriter
 Topper Headon (born 1955), English drummer